Custer of the West is a 1967 American Western film directed by Robert Siodmak that presents a highly fictionalised version of the life and death of George Armstrong Custer, starring Robert Shaw as Custer, Robert Ryan, Ty Hardin, Jeffrey Hunter, and Mary Ure. The film was shot entirely in Spain.

Plot
With no better offers to be had, famous American Civil War upstart officer George Armstrong Custer takes over the Western Cavalry maintaining the peace in the Dakotas. He soon learns that the U.S. treaties are a sham, that Indian lands are being stolen and every excuse for driving them off their hunting grounds is being encouraged. With his wife Elizabeth Custer goes in and out of favor in Washington, while failing to keep wildcatting miners like his own deserting Sergeant Mulligan from running off to prospect for gold in Indian country. After trying to humble the prideful Indian warrior Dull Knife (Kieron Moore), Custer leads the 7th Cavalry into defeat.

Cast
 Robert Shaw as General George Armstrong Custer
 Mary Ure as Elizabeth Custer
 Ty Hardin as Major Marcus Reno
 Jeffrey Hunter as Captain Frederick Benteen
 Lawrence Tierney as General Philip Sheridan
 Marc Lawrence as the gold miner
 Kieron Moore as Chief Dull Knife
 Charles Stalmaker as Lt. Howells
 Robert Hall as Sgt. Buckley
 Robert Ryan as Sgt. Mulligan
John Clark as the Fort surgeon
Barta Barri as The Grand Duke Alexis

Production
In the mid 1960s 20th Century Fox announced plans to make a film about Custer called The Day Custer Fell, directed by Fred Zinnemann, with Robert Shaw among the actors considered to play the title role. It was cancelled on grounds of cost.

Producer Philip Yordan decided to make his own Custer movie and hired Bernard Gordon and Julian Zimet to write a script. According to Zimet, “The original brief was to turn out a typical Western sainted hero martyr script, which Gordon and I duly delivered. But Robert Shaw figured he would make it over to suit himself. Which he did. He turned Custer into a sadist of Shakespearean depth.”

According to Bernard Gordon, "Production stumbled along on Custer as Julian and I tried to give the Indians a fair shake. Robert Shaw was helpful. A bright man and a fine writer, he approved of our point of view of that the Indians were victims right to the end. He even wrote one speech for Custer… that made this point sharply.”

Yordan said he needed a known star (Shaw) and director (Siodmak) to raise the funds to make the movie.

Julian Zimet later elaborated:
Shaw took care of the battle scenes himself. Siodmak preferred directing ballroom scenes, which he had done so often in his long career they required no invention. What he didn’t anticipate, as he choreographed fifty couples, was that the actor—whose intervention was designed to give coherence to the scene—would go crazy, punch him in the chops, and walk off the set. I was already working on another project, but Yordan insisted that I write some lines for a minor actor, which would account for the miscreant’s absence. This would allow the ballroom scene to continue, save having to locate the crazy or drunk actor, and save having to reshoot. While Siodmak kept the dancers in motion, I rehearsed the new actor in his role, and tailors stitched together a bespoke uniform. Within minutes he burst upon the scene, apologised on behalf of the government minister for his absence—due to a crisis in Washington—and announced an impending honour for Custer. It was a weak solution, but it saved a lot of money. That’s show business for you.
The film was originally known as Custer's West. It was one of two big screen epics made by Security Pictures (a company of Louis Dolivet and Philip Yordan) in the  Cinerama process, the other being Krakatoa, East of Java. Security borrowed $6 million from the First National Bank to make the films in collaboration with Pacific Theatres. Pacific and Security Pictures gave distribution rights to Cinerama. Cinerama bought out most of the rights of Pacific and Security Pictures then sold 50% of the movie to ABC Films.

Most of the film was shot within 30 miles of Madrid except for the Battle of Little Big Horn which was filmed in Almería near Costa del Sol.

Reception
The film met with a largely negative reaction from critics. At Rotten Tomatoes, the film received only a 25% "rotten" rating. It holds average rating of 4.1/10. Many were unimpressed by the attempt to shoehorn two different viewpoints into the same film – the mistreatment of the native Americans by American troops, and the portrayal of Custer as an American hero who was not to blame for the disaster. The general inaccuracies of the film were also questioned, particularly the portrayal of the Battle of the Little Bighorn. The film only returned theatrical rentals of $400,000 in the United States and Canada.

Home media
Custer of the West was released to VHS by Anchor Bay Entertainment on July 14, 1998 and on DVD by MGM Home Video on May 25, 2004, as a Region 1 widescreen DVD.

See also
List of American films of 1967
List of American films of 1966

References

External links

Custer of the West at TCMDB
Review of film at DVD Talk
Review of film at The New York Times
Custer of the West at Cinerama

1967 Western (genre) films
1967 films
American Indian Wars films
Western (genre) cavalry films
1960s English-language films
Films directed by Robert Siodmak
Films shot in Madrid
American Western (genre) films
Films set in 1876
Films set in South Dakota
Films scored by Bernardo Segall
Cultural depictions of George Armstrong Custer
Films about Native Americans
Films shot in Almería
Cinerama Releasing Corporation films
1960s historical films
American historical films
1960s American films